This is a list of attacks by the Revolutionary People's Liberation Party/Front (Turkish: Devrimci Halk Kurtuluş Partisi-Cephesi or DHKP-C), a far-left terrorist group that existed in Turkey. Casualties includes any perpetrators.

References

Attacks
Attacks in the 2000s
Revolutionary People's Liberation Party/Front